Kent is a town in Litchfield County, Connecticut, United States. Located alongside the border with New York, the town's population was 3,019 according to the 2020 census. Kent is home to three boarding schools: Kent School, the Marvelwood School, and South Kent School. The Schaghticoke Indian Reservation is also located within town borders. The town is also home to former U.S. Secretary of State Henry Kissinger.

History
The town of Kent was sectioned in 1737 and settled about 1739. The town was named after County Kent in England.

Geography
Kent is in western Litchfield County and is bordered to the west by Dutchess County, New York. Bull's Bridge, one of two covered bridges open to vehicles in Connecticut, is located in the town. The town is bisected by the Housatonic River. The western half contains Macedonia Brook State Park, the Schaghticoke Indian Reservation, and a section of the Appalachian Trail.

Principal communities
Bulls Bridge
Flanders
Kent center
Kent Furnace
Macedonia
North Kent
South Kent (has its own post office)
Schaghticoke Indian Reservation

Points of interest

Macedonia Brook State Park

Besides the pure beauty of Appalachia, the park also boasts extensive trails, campgrounds, a venue for large group picnics, a small hilltop lake, and the park's namesake, Macedonia Brook. Visitors can also take advantage of the numerous grills set up around the park. From peaks on the Blue Trail, hikers can take in views of the Catskill Mountains and the Taconic Mountains.

Kent Falls State Park

Kent Falls State Park is often called "The Jewel of the Inland Parks" with its views of 17 waterfalls. The falls are fed by wetlands which are located in Warren, and empties into the Housatonic River, which is directly across the highway from the park.

In 2006 a $1.1 million trail renovation was finished which provided new viewing platforms and a redesigned trail. Swimming was at one time allowed along the entire length of the falls, but due to a number of serious accidents, and large-scale damage to the natural environment, all of the area along the water above the bottom level is now closed by state law.

The park is designated as a Trout Park and is stocked with trout from the state's hatcheries. Due to the Trout Park designation the daily creel limit in the park is two fish.

Bulls Bridge

Bull's Bridge is one of three remaining covered bridges in Connecticut dating from the 19th century. George Washington crossed the Housatonic River near the site of the present bridge in 1781. Built in 1842 by architect Ithiel Town, this single-lane covered bridge features a lattice truss design.

Sloane-Stanley Museum

A museum featuring the studio and antique collections of Eric Sloane.

Connecticut Antique Machinery Association

A non-profit museum dedicated to preserving and restoring antique machinery and educating the public on Connecticut's industrial and agricultural history. One notable exhibit is its  narrow-gauge railroad, which features an operating steam locomotive.

Demographics

As of the census of 2000, there were 2,858 people, 1,143 households, and 744 families residing in the town. The racial makeup of the town was 95.77% White, 0.56% Black or African American, 0.77% Native American, 0.98% Asian, 0.03% Pacific Islander, 0.70% from other races, and 1.19% from two or more races.  2.52% of the population were Hispanic or Latino of any race. The most numerous ethnic groups in Kent are:
 English – 19%
 Irish – 16%
 German – 14%
 Italian – 7%
 Scottish – 5%

There were 1,143 households, out of which 28.6% had children under the age of 18 living with them, 55.6% were married couples living together, 6.7% had a female householder with no husband present, and 34.9% were non-families. 28.3% of all households were made up of individuals, and 12.6% had someone living alone who was 65 years of age or older.  The average household size was 2.43 and the average family size was 2.99.

In the town, the population was spread out, with 22.8% under the age of 18, 5.2% from 18 to 24, 26.3% from 25 to 44, 27.8% from 45 to 64, and 17.8% who were 65 years of age or older.  The median age was 43 years. For every 100 females, there were 93.9 males.  For every 100 females age 18 and over, there were 90.6 males.

The median income for a household in the town was $53,906, and the median income for a family was $66,065. Males had a median income of $46,343 versus $31,493 for females. The per capita income for the town was $38,674.  About 0.1% of families and 3.2% of the population were below the poverty line, including none of those under age 18 and 10.8% of those age 65 or over.

Education

Kent is a member of Regional School District 01, which also includes the towns of Canaan, Cornwall, North Canaan, Salisbury, and Sharon. Public school students attend Kent Center School from grades K–8 and Housatonic Valley Regional High School from grades 9–12. Kent also has three private schools: Kent School, a coed Episcopal independent school serving grades 9–12/PG, South Kent School, an all-boys Episcopal independent school, and Marvelwood School, a coed non-sectarian independent school.

Transportation
U.S. Route 7 is the main north–south highway in the town, while Connecticut Route 341 is the main east–west highway. Route 7 leads north  to North Canaan and south  to Danbury, while Route 341 leads east  to Warren and west to the New York border and the town of Amenia.

Notable people

 William H. Armstrong, author of Sounder
 Herman R. Beardsley, Justice of the Vermont Supreme Court
 Joe Bouchard, founding member of rock group Blue Öyster Cult
 Rex Brasher, ornithologist and watercolor painter; lived in Kent
 James Burnham, American political theorist, spent his final years in Kent, where he died
 Ted Danson, actor and graduate of Kent School
 Oscar de la Renta, fashion designer
 Lana Del Rey, singer and graduate of Kent School
 Brendan Fraser, actor
 Clinton Kelly, television host
 Adam Kennedy, actor, author, painter; died in Kent
 Henry Kissinger, former U.S. Secretary of State; has a home in town and often does television interviews from Kent
 Trudie Lamb-Richmond, Schaghticoke elder, former tribal chairwoman, American Indian activist, author, educator, cultural leader, storyteller, and tribal historian
 Patti LuPone, singer and actress
 Seth MacFarlane, animator, TV producer and director and voice actor and singer who created Family Guy, Cleveland Show, American Dad! and The Orville; born in Kent, as well as his sister Rachael MacFarlane 
 Edmund Morris, Pulitzer Prize-winning writer
 Lynn Redgrave, actress
 Frederick Herbert Sill, founder of Kent School
 Brooke Stevens, novelist
 Joy Brown, ceramist, sculptor

References

External links

Official town website
Kent Chamber of Commerce
Kent Center School
Kent Land Trust
 Weantinoge Heritage Land Trust
Schaghticoke Tribal Nation

 
Towns in Litchfield County, Connecticut
Towns in the New York metropolitan area
Towns in Connecticut